Arun Kumar Gupta is a retired IPS officer. He was the Director General of Uttar Pradesh Police for a month in the Akhilesh Yadav Government.

Indian Police Service
He is a 1977-batch Indian Police Service IPS officer.

Previous posting
Director General of Police of Police Recruitment and Promotion Board.

See also
Law enforcement in India

References

Indian police officers
Director Generals of Uttar Pradesh Police
Indian civil servants
Living people
Year of birth missing (living people)